Niccolò Galli (22 May 1983 — 10 February 2001) was a promising professional footballer who played as a centre-back; he died in a road traffic accident aged 17.

Career
The son of former Italian international goalkeeper Giovanni Galli, he began with his hometown club, Fiorentina, before moving to Arsenal in August 1999. He spent one year in London, winning the FA Youth Cup in 2000, then returning to Italy to finish his studies. He was on loan with Bologna during this time. It was here that the promising young central defender's career really started to take off, featuring in Serie A and being recognised by Italy's youth teams, before he died; during this time, he was regarded as one of the most promising young footballers in his position.

Death
On 9 February 2001, Galli died in a road accident while riding on his moped, on the way home from practice at Bologna's training centre, aged 17.

Legacy
Following his death, Arsenal manager Arsène Wenger and Head of Youth Development and Academy Director Liam Brady both praised the young defender and stated he would have been a certainty to make the Arsenal first team but for his death. Wenger even went as far as to state “I have no doubt in my mind that had he lived, he would have been captain of Arsenal and of Italy.” Brady later also stated "I always remember Niccolo. Losing a boy that young was a real tragedy. He was a great footballing talent. He had a great future ahead of him." He stated that he stood out from his teammates due to his "maturity and intelligence", describing him as a "complete player", stating: "He had it all -- the ball control, passing, the physicality."  The football training centre used by Bologna FC, in the neighbourhood of Casteldebole, is named after Galli; Bologna FC also retired his number 27 shirt. Arsenal observed a minute's silence upon the news of his death. Galli's childhood friend and youth academy teammate Fabio Quagliarella wears the number 27 in his honour. A foundation has also been dedicated to Galli in his honour.

Personal life
Niccolò's father Giovanni Galli, was also a professional footballer; a former goalkeeper, he played for Fiorentina, Milan, Napoli, Torino, Parma, and Lucchese, as well as the Italy national team, before pursuing a career in politics after his retirement. His mother's name is Anna; he also had two sisters, Camilla and Carolina.

References

External links
 Niccolò Galli Foundation 

1983 births
2001 deaths
Italian footballers
Association football defenders
Italy youth international footballers
Serie A players
ACF Fiorentina players
Parma Calcio 1913 players
Arsenal F.C. players
Bologna F.C. 1909 players
Motorcycle road incident deaths
Road incident deaths in Italy